Favositella is an extinct genus of bryozoans from the Ordovician, Silurian and Devonian periods.

Species 
The following species are recognised:

 † Favositella anolotichoides Oakley, 1966 
 † Favositella discoidaliformis Modzalevskaya, 1972 
 † Favositella discoidalis Bassler, 1911
 † Favositella exserta Bassler, 1911
 † Favositella gotlandica Oakley, 1966 
 † Favositella incondita Ulrich & Bassler, 1913
 † Favositella integrimuralis Kiepura, 1973
 † Favositella interpuncta (Quenstedt, 1878)
 † Favositella jucunda Kopajevich, 1984
 † Favositella mammilata Fritz, 1957 
 † Favositella minganensis Twenhofel, 1938 
 † Favositella mirabilis (Astrova, 1965)
 † Favositella ordinata Kopajevich, 1984
 † Favositella squamata (Lonsdale, 1839)
 † Favositella texturata Snell, 2004
 † Favositella varians (Nekhoroshev, 1948)

References

Cystoporida
Ordovician bryozoans
Silurian bryozoans
Devonian bryozoans
Stenolaemata genera
Prehistoric bryozoan genera
Prehistoric life of Europe
Darriwilian first appearances
Eifelian extinctions
Paleozoic life of Ontario
Bryozoan genera
Extinct bryozoans